"Like a Star in the Night" is Mai Kuraki's 13th single, released on September 4, 2002

Track listing

Charts

Oricon sales chart

References

External links
Mai Kuraki Official Website

2002 singles
2002 songs
Mai Kuraki songs
Giza Studio singles
Songs written by Mai Kuraki
Songs written by Aika Ohno
Song recordings produced by Daiko Nagato